Schnitger is a surname. Notable people with the surname include:

Arp Schnitger (1648–1719), German pipe organ builder
Hans Schnitger, Dutch field hockey player
Lara Schnitger, Dutch-American sculptor

See also
29203 Schnitger, a main-belt asteroid
Schnitger organ (Hamburg)